The 2021 Greek Cup Final was the 77th final of the Greek Football Cup. It took place on 22 May 2021 at Olympic Stadium, between Olympiacos and PAOK. It was Olympiacos' forty-first Greek Cup Final and second consecutive, in their 97 years of existence and PAOK's twenty first Greek Cup Final of their 96-year history.

Venue

This was the twenty fifth Greek Cup Final held at the Athens Olympic Stadium, after the 1983, 1984, 1985, 1986, 1987, 1988, 1989, 1990, 1993, 1994, 1995, 1996, 1999, 2000, 2002, 2009, 2010, 2011, 2012, 2013, 2014, 2015, 2016, 2018 and 2019 finals.

The Athens Olympic Stadium was built in 1982 and renovated once in 2004. The stadium is used as a venue for AEK Athens and Greece and was used for Olympiacos and Panathinaikos in various occasions. Its current capacity is 69,618 and hosted 3 UEFA European Cup/Champions League Finals in 1983, 1994 and 2007, a UEFA Cup Winners' Cup Final in 1987, the 1991 Mediterranean Games and the 2004 Summer Olympics.

Background
Olympiacos qualified for the Greek Cup Final thirty-nine times, winning twenty eight of them. They last played in a Final in 2020, where they had won AEK Athens, 1–0.

PAOK qualified for the Greek Cup Final twenty times, winning seven of them. They last played in a Final in 2019, where they had won AEK Athens by 1–0.

Route to the final

Match

Details

References

2021
Cup Final
Greek Cup Final 2021
Greek Cup Final 2021
Sports competitions in Athens
May 2021 sports events in Europe